The Quaide Milleth College for Men is a general degree college located at Tambaram - Velachery Main Road in Medavakkam, Chennai, Tamil Nadu. It was established in the year 1975. The college is affiliated with University of Madras. This college offers different courses in arts, commerce and science.

Departments

Science

Mathematics
Computer Science

Arts and Commerce

Tamil
English
Arbic
Urdu
Economics
Commerce
Accounting & Finance
BCA
BBA

Accreditation
The college is  recognized by the University Grants Commission (UGC).

References

External links
http://www.qmcmen.com/

Educational institutions established in 1975
1975 establishments in Tamil Nadu
Colleges affiliated to University of Madras
Universities and colleges in Chennai